Yemanzhelinsk is a town and the administrative center of Yemanzhelinsky District in Chelyabinsk Oblast, Russia, located near the border with Kazakhstan on the eastern slopes of the Southern Ural Mountains,  south of Chelyabinsk, the administrative center of the oblast. Population:

History
Founded in 1770 as a Cossack village, it has been known as the stanitsa of Yemanzhelinskaya since 1866. It became a coal mining settlement in 1930–1931, which was granted town status on September 25, 1951. It was one of the places closest to the hypocenter of the blast from the 2013 Russian meteor event.

Administrative and municipal status
Within the framework of administrative divisions, Yemanzhelinsk serves as the administrative center of Yemanzhelinsky District. As an administrative division, it is, together with three rural localities, incorporated within Yemanzhelinsky District as the Town of Yemanzhelinsk. As a municipal division, the Town of Yemanzhelinsk is incorporated within Yemanzhelinsky Municipal District as Yemanzhelinskoye Urban Settlement.

Notable people
 Leontii Voitovych (b. 1951), modern Ukrainian academic historian
 Evgeny Bareev (b. 1966), chess grandmaster
Irina Shayk (b. 1986), model

References

Notes

Sources

 
Cities and towns in Chelyabinsk Oblast